Line 4, also known as Trinitat Nova – La Pau, usually called "línia groga" (yellow line), is a line in the Barcelona Metro network operated by TMB, and part of the ATM fare-integrated transport network. It serves the northern districts of the city, and it is being extended to the new major metro and rail stations Estació de la Sagrera and Sagrera-Meridiana.

Overview
Opened to the public in 1973, it serves the northern half of Barcelona using part of the infrastructure of Barcelona's first metro line the Gran Metro de Barcelona, covering a wide C-shaped area stretching from La Pau (in la Verneda) to Trinitat Nova, where it is linked with the recent L11. The 16.7 kilometres that make up the whole line are underground.

Although in 1966 it was planned for line 4 to be a loop line connecting Trinitat Nova and La Pau stations with three intermediate stations, in 1974 the plan was subsequently changed such that it became a C-shaped line of today, with provisions for two extensions northeast of Trinitat Nova (to link it with line 3 at the border of Barcelona and Santa Coloma de Gramenet) and La Pau stations (intended to penetrate inside Santa Coloma de Gramenet) that have never been realised.

Chronology
1973 – Joanic-Jaume I section opened (part of it had been part of L3 previously)
1974 – Joanic-Guinardó section opened
1976 – Jaume I-Barceloneta section opened
1977 – Barceloneta-Selva de Mar section opened
1982 – Guinardó-Via Júlia and Selva de Mar-La Pau sections opened.
1985 – La Pau-Pep Ventura section opened
1999 – Via Júlia-Trinitat Nova section opened.
2002 – La Pau-Pep Ventura section closed (and moved to L2)
2003 – El Maresme-Fòrum station opened.

Stations

References

External links 
 

4
Transport in Ciutat Vella
Transport in Eixample
Transport in Horta-Guinardó
Transport in Nou Barris
Transport in Sant Martí (district)
Railway lines opened in 1972
Standard gauge railways in Spain